Titus Chung Khiam Boon (Chinese: 章剑文) is the 10th Bishop of Singapore. He is a systematic theologian who serves at St. Andrew's Cathedral, Singapore. He was ordained in 1997 in the Diocese of Singapore after graduating from Trinity Theological College.

Education 

Chung studied at Trinity Theological College; and then University of Edinburgh. He received a Doctorate in Philosophy from the latter and his doctorate dissertation was on the Scottish theologian, Thomas F. Torrance's theory of divine revelation.

Priesthood 

Prior to Chung's ordination in 1997, he graduated from Trinity Theological College, Singapore. Thereafter, he became a priest and later, Vicar of the Chapel of the Holy Spirit from 1997 to 2005, before being Priest-in-charge of St Andrew’s Cathedral’s Mandarin congregation.

On 18 October 2020, Chung was installed as the 10th Bishop of Singapore.

References 

Anglicanism in Singapore
Anglican bishops of Singapore
Singaporean Anglicans
Singaporean bishops
Year of birth missing (living people)
Living people